Mahbubul Haque (born 3 November 1948) is a Bangladeshi professor, researcher and linguist. He was awarded Bangla Academy Literary Award in 2018 for his contributions in essay and Ekushey Padak in research category in 2019.

Early life
Haque was born on 3 November 1948 at Madhukhali Upazila of Faridpur District of the then East Pakistan (now Bangladesh). He graduated in Bangla Language and Literature from Chittagong University in 1969 and earned a post-graduate degree in the same subject in 1970. In 1997, he received PhD degree from the same university.

References

Recipients of Bangla Academy Award
Living people
Bangladeshi academics
Recipients of the Ekushey Padak
1948 births
University of Chittagong alumni